Toxic Shock: A Social History is a book about the evolution of pads and tampons and Toxic Shock, written by historian Sharra L. Vostral and published by New York University Press in 2018.

References

Further reading 
 Under Wraps: A History of Menstrual Hygiene Technology  Lexington Books (2008), 

2018 non-fiction books
Infectious diseases
New York University Press books